Thomas J. Calter III is the former town administrator of Kingston, Massachusetts. He previously represented the 12th Plymouth District, which includes the towns of Kingston and Plympton and parts of Plymouth, Duxbury, Halifax, and Middleborough, in the Massachusetts House of Representatives. He is a member of the Democratic Party.

Calter was elected in 2006 in a short campaign. His predecessor, Tom O'Brien was appointed to the post Treasurer of Plymouth County in August 2006, after it was too late to be taken off the ballot for the primary election. O'Brien won the popular vote in the primary election, but declined the nomination. Calter was selected in a caucus of representatives from the Democratic Town Committees in the district to be the Democratic nominee on the ballot. In the general election, Calter defeated Olly deMacedo by 296 votes. He resigned from the House in 2018 to become town administrator of Kingston.

Controversies
In early 2019, Halifax assessors demanded the payment of personal property taxes and delinquent interest in the amount of $12,511.09 by Jordan Health and Wellness Center, RKP Capital, LLC, of which Thomas Calter is the principal. Calter refused payment and instead insisted on either paying a smaller amount in the sum of $1,151.20 or appealing the issue to the Appellate Tax Board. The issue had been ongoing since mid-2016.

Calter resigned in mid-2020 from his position as Town Administrator in Kingston after a public argument with a member of the Board of Selectmen in a local restaurant. The argument was a violation of town conduct policy.

Personal life
Calter was raised in Avon, Massachusetts and attended North Adams State College. He earned a master's degree in Business Administration from Northeastern University. Calter spent more than 30 years working in the environmental services industry.

Calter and his wife Patty live in Kingston and have three grown children, Ryan, Kerri, and Patrick.

References

Massachusetts House of Representatives profile

Year of birth missing (living people)
Living people
People from Norfolk County, Massachusetts
People from Kingston, Massachusetts
Northeastern University alumni
Democratic Party members of the Massachusetts House of Representatives
Massachusetts city managers
Massachusetts College of Liberal Arts alumni
21st-century American politicians